Laksevåg is a borough of the city of Bergen in Vestland county, Norway.  The borough is located in the western part of the municipality.  Historically, the area was called Laxevaag, and it was a separate municipality until 1972 when it was merged into Bergen.

The borough of Laksevåg has residential areas on the hillside of the mountain Damsgårdsfjellet facing the Puddefjorden. By the fjord itself are several industrial buildings, many of them connected with the maritime industry. The rococo-style Damsgård Manor is located in the borough.

Like the neighboring borough of Fyllingsdalen, many of the neighborhoods of Laksevåg consist of apartment buildings, especially in the area around the main service centre, the Vestkanten shopping centre. The main road to Sotra passes through the Loddefjord area in western Laksevåg.

History
The municipality of Laksevåg was established on 1 July 1918 when it was separated from the municipality of Askøy. On 1 January 1972, the municipalities surrounding the city of Bergen were merged with the city to form a large new municipality of Bergen. The municipalities involved in the merger were Arna, Fana, Laksevåg and Åsane.

Since the merger, the area is now the borough of the city of Bergen, with very similar borders to those of the old municipality. After it was merged with Bergen, the former municipality was split into two boroughs: Laksevåg, which consisted of neighborhoods south of Puddefjorden separating it from the city centre, and Loddefjord, consisting of neighborhoods further west, closer to the islands of Sotra.  In 2000, the boroughs were merged forming the borough of Laksevåg.

Geography

Villages and neighborhoods
The borough of Laksevåg includes the villages and neighborhoods: Alvøen, Bjørndal, Drotningsvik, Godvik, Gravdal, Hetlevik, Håkonshella, Kjøkkelvik, Loddefjord, Loddefjorddalen, Mathopen, Olsvik, and Vadmyra.

Local attractions 
 Alvøen Mansion (Alvøen  Hovedbygning) – Historic building constructed in the 1790s, reconstruction in 1830.  opened as a museum in 1983
 Damsgård Manor – Historic manor house and estate
 Gravdal Manor (Gravdal hovedgård) – Historic  Gravdal manor house, later military command headquarters 
 Kvarven Fort – Coastal defense  built to protect the local port and naval installations
 Lyderhorn – One of the seven mountains surrounding Bergen
 Damsgård Mountain (Damsgårdsfjellet) – One of the seven mountains surrounding Bergen

Gallery

References

Footnotes

Bibliography

Boroughs of Bergen